The following is a list of colleges and universities with campuses in Lubbock, Texas:
 Covenant School of Nursing (Covenant Health System)
 Covenant School of Radiography (Covenant Health System)
 Kaplan College
 Lubbock Christian University
 South Plains College
 Sunset International Bible Institute
 Texas Tech University
 College of Agricultural Sciences & Natural Resources
 College of Architecture
 College of Arts & Sciences
 College of Education
 College of Human Sciences
 College of Media & Communication
 Talkington College of Visual & Performing Arts
 Graduate School
 Rawls College of Business
 School of Law
 School of Music
 Whitacre College of Engineering
 Texas Tech University Health Sciences Center
 Anita Thigpen Perry School of Nursing
 Graduate School of Biomedical Sciences
 School of Allied Health Sciences
 School of Medicine
 School of Pharmacy
 Virginia College
 Wayland Baptist University
Texas Bible College

South Plains College is the community college, designated under Texas law, for all of Lubbock County.

References

 
Lubbock
Lubbock, Texas-related lists